Joe Kowalewski (born November 15, 1982) is a former American football fullback. He was signed by the New York Jets as an undrafted free agent in 2006. He played college football at Syracuse.

Kowalewski has also been a member of the Miami Dolphins.

Early years
Born in Syracuse, New York, Kowalewski attended Solvay High School. In high school, he rushed for 1,114 yards and 12 touchdowns as a senior, and excelled on both sides of the ball.

College career
While at Syracuse, Kowalewski moved from defensive end to linebacker prior to the 2002 Spring practice, and to tight end before the beginning of the 2002 season. He totaled 33 receptions for 441 yards and three touchdowns during his collegiate career, while also achieving success academically. He graduated with a degree in retail and consumer studies.

Professional career

New York Jets
Due to injuries, Kowalewski was unable to work out for pro scouts. He went undrafted in the 2006 NFL Draft, but received invitations to try out for both the New York Jets and the Miami Dolphins. On the advice of his agent, he signed as an undrafted rookie free agent with New York on May 15, 2006.

After spending the 2006 season on the practice squad, Kowalewski made his NFL debut in the opening week of the 2007 season in a loss to the New England Patriots. Kowalewski scored his first NFL touchdown on November 4, 2007, against the Washington Redskins.

Kowalewski was waived on April 28, 2008.

Miami Dolphins
Kowalewski signed with the Miami Dolphins on August 11, 2009. He caught a two-yard touchdown pass from Chad Henne in the Dolphins' preseason contest against the Carolina Panthers on August 22. He was waived/injured on August 29 and subsequently placed on injured reserve on September 1 and eventually released with an injury settlement.

References

External links
Miami Dolphins bio
New York Jets bio

1982 births
Living people
Players of American football from Syracuse, New York
American football tight ends
American football fullbacks
Syracuse Orange football players
New York Jets players
Miami Dolphins players